The meridian 22° west of Greenwich is a line of longitude that extends from the North Pole across the Arctic Ocean, Greenland, Iceland, the Atlantic Ocean, the Southern Ocean, and Antarctica to the South Pole.

The 22nd meridian west forms a great circle with the 158th meridian east.

From Pole to Pole
Starting at the North Pole and heading south to the South Pole, the 22nd meridian west passes through:

{| class="wikitable plainrowheaders"
! scope="col" width="125" | Co-ordinates
! scope="col" | Country, territory or sea
! scope="col" | Notes
|-
| style="background:#b0e0e6;" | 
! scope="row" style="background:#b0e0e6;" | Arctic Ocean
| style="background:#b0e0e6;" |
|-
| 
! scope="row" | 
| Peary Land peninsula
|-
| style="background:#b0e0e6;" | 
! scope="row" style="background:#b0e0e6;" | Independence Fjord
| style="background:#b0e0e6;" |
|-valign="top"
| 
! scope="row" | 
| Passing through Danmark Fjord and Gael Hamke Bay
|-
| style="background:#b0e0e6;" | 
! scope="row" style="background:#b0e0e6;" | Foster Bay
| style="background:#b0e0e6;" |
|-valign="top"
| 
! scope="row" | 
| Geographical Society Island and Traill Island
|-
| style="background:#b0e0e6;" | 
! scope="row" style="background:#b0e0e6;" | Atlantic Ocean
| style="background:#b0e0e6;" | Greenland Sea
|-
| 
! scope="row" | 
| Jameson Land peninsula
|-
| style="background:#b0e0e6;" | 
! scope="row" style="background:#b0e0e6;" | Atlantic Ocean
| style="background:#b0e0e6;" | Greenland Sea
|-
| 
! scope="row" | 
| Westfjords peninsula
|-
| style="background:#b0e0e6;" | 
! scope="row" style="background:#b0e0e6;" | Breiðafjörður
| style="background:#b0e0e6;" | 
|-
| 
! scope="row" | 
|
|-
| style="background:#b0e0e6;" | 
! scope="row" style="background:#b0e0e6;" | Breiðafjörður
| style="background:#b0e0e6;" | 
|-
| 
! scope="row" | 
|
|-
| style="background:#b0e0e6;" | 
! scope="row" style="background:#b0e0e6;" | Faxaflói
| style="background:#b0e0e6;" | 
|-
| 
! scope="row" | 
| Passing just west of Reykjavík
|-
| style="background:#b0e0e6;" | 
! scope="row" style="background:#b0e0e6;" | Atlantic Ocean
| style="background:#b0e0e6;" |
|-
| style="background:#b0e0e6;" | 
! scope="row" style="background:#b0e0e6;" | Southern Ocean
| style="background:#b0e0e6;" |
|-
| 
! scope="row" | Antarctica
| British Antarctic Territory, claimed by 
|-
|}

See also
21st meridian west
23rd meridian west

w022 meridian west